The Bac de Roda Bridge, known locally as the Calatrava bridge, is a road bridge that links the districts of Sant Andreu and Sant Martí in the city of Barcelona, Catalonia, Spain. The bridge was constructed between 1984 and 1987, to a design by Santiago Calatrava, as part of the preparations for the 1992 Summer Olympics.

The bridge connects the Carrer de Bac de Roda, to the south in Sant Martí, with the Carrer de Felip II, to the north in Sant Andreu, across the main railway approaches to Barcelona from the north.

Pictures

References

External links

Bridges completed in 1987
Bridges in Catalonia
Buildings and structures in Barcelona
Road bridges in Spain
Transport in Barcelona